William Cox, Will Cox, Bill Cox, or Billy Cox may refer to:

Arts and entertainment
Bill Cox (1897–1968), American country and folk musician
Billy Cox (born 1941), American bassist best known for playing with guitarist Jimi Hendrix
Will Cox (actor), Australian actor associated with Independent Theatre, an Adelaide theatre company
William R. Cox (1901–1988), writer of short stories and Western and mystery novels

Military
William Cox (British general) (1776–1864), British general of the peninsular war, in Siege of Almeida
William Ruffin Cox (1832–1919), Confederate general in the United States Civil War, later Secretary of the United States
William Reginald Cox (1905–1988), British Army officer
William Sitgreaves Cox (1790–1874), court-martialled acting third lieutenant of the USS Chesapeake

Law
William Cox (Nova Scotia lawyer) (1921–2008), past president of the Canadian Bar Association
William Harold Cox (1901–1988), U.S. federal judge
William John Cox (born 1941), American public interest lawyer, prosecutor, author and political activist

Politicians
William Cox (British politician) (1817–1889), Member of Parliament for Finsbury 1857–1859, 1861–1865
William Cox (governor) (born 1936), known as Bill Cox, Governor of the state of Tasmania, Australia
William E. Cox (1861–1942), U.S. Representative from Indiana
William H. Cox Jr. (born 1942), American politician from Maryland
William Hopkinson Cox (1856–1950), American politician; Lieutenant Governor of Kentucky
William Thomas Cox (1808–1877), British politician
William Wesley Cox (1865–1948), Presidential, Vice Presidential, and perennial U.S. Senate candidate of the Socialist Labor Party

Sports
Bill Cox (American football) (1929–2017), former American football end
Bill Cox (baseball) (1913–1988), American Major League Baseball pitcher and Illinois state legislator
Bill Cox (golfer)  (1910–1985), author and professional golfer at Fulwell Golf Club from 1946 to 1975
Bill Cox (footballer) (1880–1915), English football centre forward
Bill Cox (runner) (1904–1996), United States Olympic medallist
Bill Cox (speed skater) (born 1947), American Olympic speed skater
Billy Cox (baseball) (1919–1978), American Major League Baseball middle infielder
William Cox (wrestler), British Olympic wrestler
William D. Cox (1909–1989), American businessman and sports executive
William Samuel Cox (1831–1895), Australian racecourse owner, namesake of the Cox Plate

Others
William Cox (pioneer) (1764–1837), constructor of the road across the Blue Mountains in New South Wales, Australia
William Denton Cox (1883–1912), heroic steward aboard RMS Titanic
William George Cox (c. 1821–1878), Gold Commissioner for the Cariboo and Boundary Districts in the Colony of British Columbia, Canada
William M. Cox (born 1942), American highways administrator
William Sands Cox (1802–1875), surgeon in Birmingham, England
William T. L. Cox (born 1984), American social psychologist

See also
William Cox Ellis (1787–1871), member of the United States House of Representatives from Pennsylvania
George William Cox (1827–1902), British historian
William Coxe (disambiguation)
William Cocks (disambiguation)
William Cocke (1748–1828), American lawyer